Isaiah Dwight Mack (born March 19, 1996) is an American football defensive tackle for the New York Jets of the National Football League (NFL). He played college football at Chattanooga.

Early life and high school
Mack was born and grew up in Tunnel Hill, Georgia. He attended Northwest Whitfield High School, where he played football and competed in wrestling. As a junior, Mack made 137 tackles (30 for loss) and eight sacks, highlighted by a 30-tackle performance against Gilmer High School that included nine tackles for loss, and was named first-team All-Region 7-AAAA and the regional defensive player of the year. As a senior, he repeated as first-team all-region and the defensive player of the year after tallying 121 tackles, 21 for loss, and 29 quarterback pressures with four forced fumbles. He committed to play college football at the University of Tennessee at Chattanooga over offers from Georgia Southern, Appalachian State, Eastern Kentucky, Georgia State, Coastal Carolina and Kennesaw State.

College career
Mack was a member of the Chattanooga Mocs football team for five seasons, redshirting his freshman year. He became a starter on the Mocs defensive line in his redshirt freshman season, making 54 tackles, nine for a loss, 3.5 sacks and a forced fumble and was named to the Southern Conference (SoCon) All-Freshman team. As a redshirt sophomore, Mack made 36 tackles and finished fourth in the conference in both tackles for loss (14) and sacks (7.5). He was named second-team All-SoCon as a redshirt junior after recording 54 tackles, seven for a loss, and 1.5 sacks. Mack was named a first-team All-American by the Associated Press, first-team All-SoCon and the SoCon Defensive Player of the Year as a redshirt senior after tallying 78 tackles (11 for loss), 8.5 sacks, two passes defensed, two forced fumbles, and one fumble recovery.

Professional career

Tennessee Titans
Mack signed as an undrafted free agent with the Tennessee Titans on April 28, 2019 and made the team out of training camp. Mack made his NFL debut in the season opener against the Cleveland Browns, recording one tackle in the 43-13 road victory. In the next game against the Indianapolis Colts, he recorded his first NFL sack after bringing down quarterback Jacoby Brissett in a narrow 19-17 loss. During Week 8 against the Tampa Bay Buccaneers, Mack recovered a fumble lost by Jameis Winston in the 27-23 win. 

Mack finished his rookie year with eight tackles, a fumble recovery, and 1.5 sacks.

On November 2, 2020, Mack was waived by the Titans.

New England Patriots
On November 3, 2020, Mack was claimed off waivers by the New England Patriots. He was waived on December 19, 2020, and re-signed to the practice squad four days later. He was placed on the practice squad/COVID-19 by the team on December 25, 2020, and restored to the practice squad on January 4, 2021. His practice squad contract with the team expired after the season on January 11, 2021.

Denver Broncos
On February 11, 2021, the Denver Broncos signed Mack. He was waived on August 31, 2021.

Pittsburgh Steelers
On October 12, 2021, Mack was signed to the Pittsburgh Steelers practice squad. He was released on November 15, 2021.

Baltimore Ravens
On November 17, 2021, Mack was signed to the Baltimore Ravens practice squad. He signed a reserve/future contract with the Ravens on January 13, 2022.

On August 30, 2022, Mack was waived by the Ravens and signed to the practice squad the next day. He was promoted to the active roster on December 23. He was waived on December 26.

Seattle Seahawks
On December 27, 2022, Mack was claimed off waivers by the Seattle Seahawks. He was waived on January 13, 2023.

New York Jets
On January 16, 2023, Mack was claimed off waivers by the New York Jets, but not officially added to their roster until after Super Bowl LVII.

NFL career statistics

References

External links
Tennessee Titans bio
Chattanooga Mocs bio

Living people
1996 births
People from Whitfield County, Georgia
Players of American football from Georgia (U.S. state)
American football defensive tackles
Chattanooga Mocs football players
Tennessee Titans players
New England Patriots players
Denver Broncos players
Pittsburgh Steelers players
Baltimore Ravens players
Seattle Seahawks players
New York Jets players